Peter Crawford (born 6 November 1979) is an Australian basketball coach and former player.

Playing career
In 1998, Crawford was a member of the Townsville Heat's losing ABA semi-final team. Two years later, he helped the Heat win the QBL championship.

At the age of 19, Crawford made his NBL debut for the Townsville Crocodiles in 1999. In 2001, he was a member of the Crocodiles' losing grand final team. In 2004, he was cut by Townsville and was picked up by the Perth Wildcats. In his first season with a Wildcats, he was named the NBL Most Improved Player. From 2007 to 2011, he played for the Perry Lakes Hawks of the State Basketball League.

In 2009, Crawford left the Wildcats and returned to the Townsville Crocodiles, where he spent the next five seasons. In 2011, he was named to the All-NBL Third Team. A year later, he earned All-NBL Second Team honours. Crawford is the all-time leader in games played for the Crocodiles with 292 games, passing Robert Rose (258) in the 2012–13 season.

Crawford's final season in the NBL, the 2014–15 season, was spent with the Adelaide 36ers.

In 2015 and 2016, Crawford played for the West Adelaide Bearcats in the South Australian Premier League. He then played for the Townsville Heat, helping them win a championship in 2017.

Coaching career 
In 2021, Crawford joined the Brisbane Bullets as an assistant coach for the 2021–22 NBL season. He parted ways with the Bullets following the 2022–23 NBL season.

Crawford is set to serve as head coach of the Southern Districts Spartans men's team in the 2023 NBL1 North season.

References

External links
NBL stats
SBL stats
Peter Crawford Player History at nbl.com.au
Peter Crawford Q&A at nbl.com.au
Peter Crawford 2004 profile at nbl.com.au

1979 births
Living people
Adelaide 36ers players
Australian men's basketball players
Basketball players at the 2012 Summer Olympics
Olympic basketball players of Australia
People from Mount Isa
Perth Wildcats players
Shooting guards
Small forwards
Townsville Crocodiles players